The IAR 99 Șoim (Hawk) is an advanced trainer and light attack aircraft capable of performing close air support and reconnaissance missions. The IAR 99 replaced the Aero L-29 Delfin and Aero L-39 Albatros as the jet trainer of the Romanian Air Force. The aircraft is of semi-monocoque design, with tapered wings and a swept-back tail unit. A large blade-type antenna installed beneath the nose on the port side of the fuselage gives the IAR 99 trainer a distinctive appearance.

Development
The design of the aircraft started in 1975 and this would be the first jet trainer fully designed and built in Romania. In 1979 funding was approved for building the first trainer by I.Av. Craiova where the IAR 93 attack aircraft was currently built. The prototype (S-001) flew on 21 December 1985 with Lt. Col. Vagner Ștefănel at the controls. S-002 served for static (ground) testing, S-003 being the second flying prototype (later re-serialled 7003).  

The aircraft entered series production in 1987, with 17 aircraft delivered to the Romanian Air Force by 1989. Two were lost in the 1990s (numbers 710 and 714).  

In 1990 the fall of the Eastern Bloc created new export opportunities for the aircraft, but while the aircraft had excellent aerodynamic and handling qualities, it was left behind in its class because of its obsolete avionics, with upgrading becoming a priority. 

The first upgrade attempt was made in 1990 by I.Av.Craiova together with the Texas-based Jaffe Aircraft Corporation. Aircraft 708 and 709 were modified by installing Honeywell avionics, while the canopy was changed to a two-piece design instead of the original one piece. This change would be retained for all subsequent aircraft. 708 took its first flight on August 8th 1990 followed by 709 on August 22nd. The aircraft were displayed at the 1990 Farnborough Airshow, being proposed for the Joint Primary Aircraft Training System program for the United States of America, although this work resulted in no orders. In 1991, aircraft number 712 was outfitted with Collins avionics and took part in a show in Ankara, Turkey.

Aircraft 708, 709 and 712 were reconfigured to Standard and delivered to the Romanian Air Force.

In 1996 the upgrade program of the IAR 99 was revived with the need for a lead-in trainer for the newly upgraded MiG-21 Lancer. The Israeli company Elbit was chosen as an integrator. The avionics package is compatible with 5th generation fighter systems and it is inspired by the MiG-21 Lancer upgrade but adapted to IAR 99 needs. The first upgraded IAR 99 was the 18th production aircraft (number 718), which performed its first flight on 22 May 1997. The upgraded IAR 99 was displayed at Paris in 1997 and Farnborough in 1998. 

On 6 August 1998, the Romanian Government approved the introduction into series production of the upgrade program for 24 IAR-99 Șoim out of which 4 were supposed to be delivered by 2001. The Romanian Ministry of National Defence signs a contract for those 24 aircraft on 20 April 2000, reducing that number to 12 on 14 December 2000. Only seven of these are to be new-built (numbers 719-725), and five upgraded from existing IAR 99 (numbers 709, 711, 712, 713, 717). These were delivered between 2003 and 2008, gradually replacing the L-39 Albatros'  in service with the Romanian Air Force's training school.

Thus, the Romanian Air Force will have 12 IAR 99 C Șoim (upgraded) and 11 IAR 99 Standard, with 7003 remaining with Avioane Craiova SA as demonstrator aircraft.

In 2015, a consortium composed of Avioane Craiova,  and  announced that an enhanced version of the IAR 99 called IAR 99 TD is under development. A single airframe will be built with a new avionics suite, a engine and radar. The Leonardo Vixen 500E radar was chosen and requires lengthening the nose by 900mm. A new engine which supports computer control is required to replace the 1951 designed Rolls-Royce Viper. This in turn will need a twice as big air intake. A prototype is expected to be completed by 2022.

In December 2020, Elbit Systems announced they were awarded the contract to upgrade the remaining 10 IAR 99 Standard airframes in service with the Romanian Air Force.

Design

Cockpit
The aircraft has a tandem-stepped dual-control cockpit equipped with Martin-Baker Mk 10 zero-zero ejection seats. The instructor's seat at the rear position is raised by 35 cm to provide better visibility. The canopy was made as a single piece (prototypes and planes 701-707), later changed to a two-piece canopy, both opening to the starboard side.

The cockpit is equipped with HOTAS control and also LCDs (Liquid Crystal Display). Both the pilot and the instructor are equipped with a DASH Display and Sight Helmet which is currently deployed on the MiG 21 Lancer. The helmet guides the onboard weapons systems to the pilot's line of sight. The visor's display confirms when target acquisition has been achieved. The visor also displays the data from the HUD (Head-Up Display). Flight and navigation data are displayed on HUD, on the helmet DASH and MFDC (color multifunction displays).

Avionics

Elbit is supplying the aircraft's advanced avionics suite installed on a MIL-STD-1553B data bus. The advanced avionics suite, including communications, navigation, identification systems and the cockpit configuration, are similar to those of the MiG 21 LanceR and F-16 fighter aircraft. The IAR 99 is also equipped with video and debriefing systems.

The communication systems include VHF and UHF communications, voice-activated intercom and an IFF transponder. The flight systems include a VOR/ILS, linked VHF omnidirectional antenna radio ranger linked to the instrument landing system. Other navigation tools include distance measuring equipment (DME), an automatic direction finder (ADF), a Northrop Grumman inertial navigation system and a Trimble GPS system.

One of the best features of the aircraft's avionics is a virtual training system that allows, based on a data link system, inflight simulations of firing and air combat capabilities using two or more aircraft.

Countermeasures
The IAR 99's electronic warfare suite is based on the Elisra Electronic Systems radar warning receiver and electronic countermeasures pod plus a chaff and flare decoy dispenser. The systems are integrated through the 1553 data bus. The radar warning receiver detects pulse-Doppler, pulse and continuous wave radar threats and provides threat identification by comparing signal characteristics against a threat database.

Variants 

 IAR 99 "Standard" Initial variant designed as a lead-in trainer for the IAR-93.

 IAR 109 "Swift" In 1992 an upgrade program was started in partnership with IAI Lahav of Israel, for both Romanian Air Force use and export. Aircraft number 7003 was equipped with HOTAS (Hands On Throttle and Stick) controls in both cockpits, a wide-angle HUD (Head-Up Display) with Up Front Control Panel in the front cockpit, two 3 inch displays in both cockpits, a ring laser gyro Inertial Navigation System (INS), as well as the integration of both Eastern and Western weapon systems on the aircraft. The aircraft was displayed at the 1993 Paris Air Show and flew at Asian Aerospace in 1994. A prospective sale of 10 aircraft to Botswana was blocked in parliament, ending the collaboration with IAI. The aircraft was converted back to Standard configuration and delivered to the center for flight research and testing (CCIZ). As late as 2009 it still retained it's "Swift" styled paint scheme and logo.

IAR 99 C "Șoim" Upgraded variant using an Elbit Systems avionics package.

IAR 99 TD Technical demonstrator under development.

Operators

 Romanian Air Force - 20 aircraft in service

Notable accidents and incidents 

 On 14 August 1986, aircraft number S-002 crashed. Lt. Col. Mihai Ionescu and Mj. Mitiță Stoica safely ejected.
On 26 June 1990, aircraft number S-001: While training for an upcoming air show, during an inverted low level flight, the left wing clipped the air strip and crashed. Lt. Col. Ștefănel Vagner and Lt. Col. Mihai Ionescu died.
On 24 February 1994, aircraft number 710 burned down on the ground. No injuries incurred.
On 30 March 1995, aircraft number 714: a fuel line rupture caused a fire. Both occupants ejected safely.
 On 24 September 2004, aircraft number 721 (Șoim), suffered a bird strike to the cockpit with debris ingested by the engine. The crew attempted a crash landing and were badly injured upon impact, but recovered. The aircraft was written off.
On 23 August 2012, aircraft number 718 (Standard) crashed shortly after takeoff during a training flight. The instructor in the back seat ejected safely, suffering serious injuries. The student died.
 On 16 July 2018, aircraft number 723 (Șoim), crashed after both occupants ejected safely. Onlookers report smoke coming from the aircraft before the crash.

Specifications

See also

References

Sources
 "Romanian Falcon". Air International, September 1990, Vol 39 No. 3. pp. 129–133.

External links

National Institute for Aerospace Research "Elie Carafoli" - IAR-99 SOIM
Photo gallery

1980s Romanian military trainer aircraft
Single-engined jet aircraft
Aircraft first flown in 1985
Low-wing aircraft
99